Sir John Jacob, 1st Baronet of Bromley (–1666), was an English politician who sat in the House of Commons  in 1640 and 1641. He supported the Royalist side in the English Civil War.

Biography
Jacob was the son of Abraham Jacob of Gamlingay, Cambridgeshire and his wife Mary Rogers daughter of Francis Rogers of Dartford.  He matriculated at Merton College, Oxford  on  17 January 1617, aged 19 and was awarded BA on 6 February 1617. He became a customs farmer in the Port of London .  He was knighted on 8 May 1633 and in 1634 purchased an estate at Bromley St Leonards.

In April 1640, Jacob was elected Member of Parliament for Harwich in the Short Parliament. He was elected MP for Rye for the Long Parliament in November 1640. However he was expelled in 1641 as a tobacco monopolist. He supported the Royalist cause and his lands were sequestered. 

On the restoration he regained his office and was created a baronet of Bromley in the County of Middlesex on 11 January 1665. 

Jacob died aged about 69 and was buried on 13 March 1666 at Bromley. He built almshouses at Gaminglay and left money to the parish to support them.

Jacob married firstly Elizabeth Halliday, daughter of John Halliday and granddaughter of Sir Leonard Holliday.  They had two sons who died before him, and a daughter Susanna who married Sir Richard Wingfield Bt. He married secondly Alice Eaglesfield, widow of John Eaglesfield of London and daughter of Thomas Clowes of London and their son John succeeded in the baronetcy. He married thirdly Elizabeth Ashburnham, daughter of Sir John Ashburnham.

References

 

Alumni of Merton College, Oxford
Baronets in the Baronetage of England
Cavaliers
Burials in Kent
English MPs 1640 (April)
English MPs 1640–1648
People from Harwich
People from Rye, East Sussex
1590s births
1666 deaths
Year of birth uncertain
People from South Cambridgeshire District
Knights Bachelor